Video black level is defined as the level of brightness at the darkest (black) part of a visual image or the level of brightness at which no light is emitted from a screen, resulting in a pure black screen.

Video displays generally need to be calibrated so that the displayed black is true to the black information in the video signal. If the black level is not correctly adjusted, visual information in a video signal could be displayed as black, or black information could be displayed as above black information (gray). 

The voltage of the black level varies across different television standards. PAL sets the black level the same as the blanking level, while NTSC sets the black level approximately 54 mV above the blanking level. 

User misadjustment of black level on monitors is common. It results in darker colors having their hue changed, it affects contrast, and in many cases causes some of the image detail to be lost.

Black level is set by displaying a testcard image and adjusting display controls. With CRT displays:
 "brightness" adjusts black level
 "contrast" adjusts white level
 CRTs tend to have some interdependence of controls, so a control sometimes needs adjustment more than once.

In digital video black level usually means the range of RGB values in video signal, which can be either [0..255] (or "normal"; typical of a computer output) or [16..235] (or "low"; standard for video).

See also
Picture line-up generation equipment (PLUGE)

Display technology
Television technology